June Page is a British actress, best known for her role as Sally in the 1970s television drama Survivors.

Her other TV credits include: Doctor Who (in the serial Full Circle), Brideshead Revisited, Casualty, The Bill and Bad Girls.

External links
 

Living people
Year of birth missing (living people)
British television actresses
Place of birth missing (living people)
20th-century British actresses